The Anderson Braves were a minor league baseball team located in Anderson, South Carolina.  The team played in the South Atlantic League, and were affiliated with and owned by the Atlanta Braves. Their home stadium was the Anderson Memorial Stadium.

The Anderson Braves started playing in 1980, with a roster featuring future major leaguers Brett Butler, Brook Jacoby and Brad Komminsk. The Braves received a great deal of support from the community during the 1980 season. Local radio station WANS AM/FM was a major sponsor. "Hank Aaron Night" brought out many fans to the ballpark in August 1980.

The team experienced relatively high attendance figures that were facilitated by numerous promotions and inexpensive concessions.  Despite local support for the team, Atlanta Braves owner Ted Turner moved the team to Sumter, South Carolina after the 1984 season. The team then became the Sumter Braves.

The ballpark

The Braves played at Anderson Memorial Stadium. The stadium was built in 1970 and is still in use today, as home to the Anderson University Trojans. The ballpark seats 2,500 and is located at 1921 White Street Extension, Anderson, SC 29624.

Notable alumni
 Brett Butler (1980) MLB All-Star

 Ron Gant (1984) 2 x MLB All-Star

 Sonny Jackson (1980-1981)

 Brook Jacoby (1980) 2 x MLB All-Star

 Brad Komminsk (1980)

 Mark Lemke (1984)

 Zane Smith (1982) 

 Brian Snitker (1982) 2018 NL Manager of the Year

Year-by-year record

References

Defunct South Atlantic League teams
1980 establishments in South Carolina
1984 disestablishments in South Carolina
Atlanta Braves minor league affiliates
Professional baseball teams in South Carolina
Defunct minor league baseball teams
Defunct baseball teams in South Carolina
Baseball teams disestablished in 1984
Baseball teams established in 1980